Rugby Alberta is the provincial administrative body for rugby union in Alberta, Canada.

Competitions
 Alberta Cup (Men's)
 Alberta Women's Premier

Sub-unions
 Calgary Rugby Union
 Edmonton Rugby Union

External links
 Official site

 
Organizations based in Edmonton
Alb
Sports governing bodies in Alberta
Sports organizations established in 1961